Cold Spring is a small fresh-water spring in Ouachita National Forest, east of Waldron, Arkansas in Scott County.  It is located on the south side of County Road 93 (Cold Spring Road), a short way south of where the road crosses Sugar Creek.  The spring is protected by a stone and concrete structure erected by a crew of the Civilian Conservation Corps in c. 1936 to prevent contamination of the spring and erosion of the surrounding hillside.  Near the spring are two open-air concrete water holding areas, from which a stone culvert channels the water to Sugar Creek.  These CCC-built structures were listed on the National Register of Historic Places in 1993.

See also
National Register of Historic Places listings in Scott County, Arkansas

References

Buildings and structures on the National Register of Historic Places in Arkansas
Buildings and structures completed in 1936
Buildings and structures in Scott County, Arkansas
National Register of Historic Places in Scott County, Arkansas